Carmen Danoiu (born ) is a Romanian female former volleyball player, playing as an opposite. She was part of the Romania women's national volleyball team.

She competed at the 2001 Women's European Volleyball Championship.

References

1979 births
Living people
Romanian women's volleyball players
Place of birth missing (living people)